This is a list of Canadian films which were released in 2011:

See also
 2011 in Canada
 2011 in Canadian television

External links
Feature Films Released In 2011 With Country of Origin Canada at IMDb
Canada's Top Ten for 2011 (lists of top ten Canadian features and shorts, selected in a process administered by TIFF)

2011
Films
Canada